County Road 516 or County Route 516 may refer to:

County Road 516 (Brevard County, Florida)
County Route 516 (New Jersey)